Sky Kids may refer to:

 Sky Kids (magazine), a magazine
 Sky Kids (TV channel), a British television channel that launched on 13 February 2023
 The Flyboys (film), a film that was released internationally as Sky Kids

See also
 Sky Kid